Lecointe is a surname. Notable people with the surname include:

Alphonse Lecointe (1817–1890), French general and politician
Antony Lecointe (born 1980), French football player
Dominique Lecointe (born 1957), French rower
Georges Lecointe (disambiguation), several people
Gérard Lecointe (1912–2009), French general
Jean-François-Joseph Lecointe (1783–1858), French architect
Joseph Sadi-Lecointe (1891–1944), French aviator
Lucien Lecointe (1867–1940), French politician
Matt Lecointe (born 1994), English football player
Michel Mathieu Lecointe-Puyraveau (1764–1827), French politician

See also
Altheia Jones-LeCointe, (b. 1945) Trinidadian physician, research scientist, and British Black Panther Movement leader
Joseph Sadi-Lecointe (1891–1944), French aviator